Tommi Juntunen (born 17 March 1993) is a Swedish ice hockey defenceman, who also holds a Finnish citizenship. He made his Elitserien debut playing with Frölunda HC during the 2012–13 Elitserien season.

Juntunen was born to Finnish parents.

References

External links

1993 births
Living people
Swedish ice hockey defencemen
Frölunda HC players
Swedish people of Finnish descent
Ice hockey people from Gothenburg